Mohsen Torky is an Iranian former football referee who had been refereeing in Iran's Pro League for seasons and has been on the international list from 2003 to 2013. He was the first Iranian referee to officiate the Tehran derby after 14 years.

Referee career
Mohsen Torky started to officiate in the top league in Iran in 2000 and after just three years he became a FIFA listed referee. In 2007 Torky became an AFC Elite referee which meant that now he will regularly referee games in the AFC Champions League. In 2006, he refereed his first game in the Champions league between Al-Arabi and Al Quwa Al Jawiya and in 2007 he officiated an AFC Cup semi final.

During the 2008/09 season Torky officiated 4 games in the 2010 FIFA world cup qualifications. He also officiated four games in the group stage of the 2009 AFC Champions League but the biggest test of Torky's career came in the 66th Tehran derby when he became the first Iranian referee to officiate the game in 14 years. He did such a great job that he officiated the Tehran derby again in the 2009/10 season.
Torky was also officiate in the 2011 AFC Asian Cup. He announced his retirement in February 2013 but it was later denied.

AFC Champions League

2007

2008

2009

2011

AFC Cup

2007

2009

References

People from Boshruyeh
Iranian football referees
Living people
1973 births
AFC Asian Cup referees